John Lisseter Humphreys   (21 September 1881 – 15 December 1929) was a British colonial administrator, and Governor of North Borneo from 15 October 1926 until his death while on leave in China in December 1929.

Humphreys was educated at Bromsgrove School. He was a senior classical scholar of Brasenose College, Oxford and entered the Straits Settlement Civil Service in 1905 as Cadet. Among other appointments he has been a magistrate in Singapore and Penang. He was British Agent at Terengganu from 1916–1919; Adviser at Terengganu from 1919–25, Adviser at Kedah from 1925–1926, before being appointed Governor of North Borneo in October 1926. During his furlough in late 1929, he contracted pneumonia and was rushed to the hospital in Tientsin where he succumbed due to a heart failure on the afternoon of Sunday, 15 December.

J. L. Humphreys was awarded the C.B.E. in 1925 and the C.M.G in 1928.

Notes

References
 Janus archives catalogue

1881 births
1929 deaths
Colonial Administrative Service officers
Bromsgrove
Commanders of the Order of the British Empire
Companions of the Order of St Michael and St George
Governors of North Borneo